Proeulia onerata is a species of moth of the family Tortricidae. It is found in Chile in Ñuble Region and Maule Region.

References

Moths described in 1995
Proeulia
Moths of South America
Taxa named by Józef Razowski
Endemic fauna of Chile